"You're Sensational" is a song written by Cole Porter for the 1956 film High Society, where it was introduced by Frank Sinatra.

Notable recordings
Frank Sinatra - High Society (1956)
Bing Crosby recorded the song in 1956 for use on his radio show and it was subsequently included in the box set The Bing Crosby CBS Radio Recordings (1954-56) issued by Mosaic Records (catalog MD7-245) in 2009. 
Jack Jones - Dear Heart (1965).
Matt Monro - a single release in 1975 and included in the compilation CD The Complete Singles Collection (2010).

References

Songs written by Cole Porter
Songs from High Society (1956 film)
Frank Sinatra songs
1956 songs